Richard Schmidt may refer to:

Sports
 Richard Schmidt (basketball) (born 1942), men's head basketball coach at the University of Tampa
 Richard Schmidt (rower) (born 1987), German rower at the 2008 and 2012 Olympics
 Richard Schmidt (fencer), German fencer; see 2018 European Fencing Championships
 Richard Schmidt (tennis) (born 1965), American tennis player
 Richard Schmidt, surfer at Mavericks, California

Academics
 Richard Schmidt (linguist) (1941–2017), researcher in second-language acquisition
 Richard E. Schmidt (1865–1958), American architect of the Chicago School
 Richard Schmidt, former professor of music who taught Komitas Vardapet

Others
 Richard J. Schmidt, American, first person convicted of a crime on evidence from viral DNA analysis
 Richard Schmidt (cantor) (1877–1958), German cantor and organist
 Richard Schmidt (Heer), German general and Knight's Cross recipient
 Richard Schmidt (Indologist), German scholar who worked on the Śukasaptati

See also
 Richard Schmid (born 1934), American artist
 Richard Schmitz (1885–1954), mayor of Vienna, Austria